Nérondes is a commune in the Cher department in the Centre-Val de Loire region of France. The philologist Antoine Cabaton (1863–1942) was born in Nérondes.

Geography 
The rivers Vauvise and Airain have their sources in the commune.

Population

Sights 
 The church of St. Etienne, dating from the twelfth century.
 A sixteenth-century washhouse.
 The thirteenth-century chateau of Verrières.
 Some Gallo-Roman remains.
 A feudal motte.

See also 
Communes of the Cher department

References

External links 

Official website of the commune 
Annuaire Mairie website 

Communes of Cher (department)
Bourbonnais